Ruda  is a village in the administrative district of Gmina Sędziszów Małopolski, within Ropczyce-Sędziszów County, Subcarpathian Voivodeship, in south-eastern Poland. Ruda lies on the Tuszymka river, a tributary of the Wisłoka river. In the past this area was known for iron smelting and iron goods. In fact, the name of the village ‘Ruda’ (Polish:‘ruda’ ≈ red) comes from the red iron ore which was mined in this area. Stanisław Kot was born in this town.

The village has a population of 300.

References

Villages in Ropczyce-Sędziszów County